Machalilla is a rural parish of Puerto López Canton, Manabí Province, Ecuador.

Parishes of Puerto López Canton